Craig Dack is an Australian motorcycle champion who has driven Yamaha Motor Australia's official Motocross team since retiring as a professional rider at the end of 1992 with great success.

Known as the "Dack Attack", Craig Dack's personal successes as a rider in Australia and internationally, include winning a record four consecutive Mr Motocross titles, three Manjimup titles, two 250cc and 500cc Australian Motocross Championships, a New Zealand 250cc Motocross Championship, two Supercross Masters titles, a 250cc Supercross Championship and represented Australia in the World Motocross teams event six times, from 1986 to 1991, bringing invaluable experience to the team.

As team owner/manager of CDR Rockstar Yamaha, Craig Dack has assisted many riders to victory.  A record breaking six national titles in 1998 – Craig Anderson won five from five (Australian 250cc Supercross and Motocross Championships, Supercross Masters, Thumper Nationals Pro 650cc class and Pro Outright), and Daryl Hurley won the Thumper Nationals Pro 400 class. Australia's hottest sensation Chad Reed won the 2000 Australian 250cc Championship. King won the 2001 Australian 250/Open class Motocross Championship, the Thumper Nationals and the 250/500cc New Zealand Motocross Championship, his most successful season yet at 32 years of age. Troy Carroll returned to racing after three years of Freestyle competition and joined the CDR camp two months into 2001 and went on to wrap up the Australian 125cc. This year Carroll has gone all out again winning the 2003 Australian Pro Lite Motocross Championships and 2003 4 Stroke Pro Lites Nationals Title and the 2003 Australian 125cc SX Championship. In total the CDR team has won 26 national titles since the beginning of 1993.

Not only has Craig Dack had a huge impact on Australian soil, in 2002 Craig led Aussie superstar Chad Reed to success on the Yamaha of Troy team in the United States.

In 2006 he was appointed the Ambassador for Australia's premier motocross championship, the Nokia MX Nationals.

References

External links

Australian motocross riders
Living people
Year of birth missing (living people)